The women's 200 metres event at the 2015 Military World Games was held on 7 and 8 October at the KAFAC Sports Complex.

Records
Prior to this competition, the existing world and CISM record were as follows:

Schedule

Medalists

Results

Round 1
Qualification: First 2 in each heat (Q) and next 2 fastest (q) qualified for the final.

Wind:Heat 1: -1.6 m/s, Heat 2: -1.0 m/s, Heat 3: -0.9 m/s

Final
Wind: +3.2 m/s

References

200
2015 in women's athletics